Estadio Alberto Grisales is an association football stadium in Rionegro. It is currently the home stadium of Categoría Primera A club Rionegro Águilas. It has a capacity for 14,000 people.

See also 
 List of football stadiums in Colombia

References 
El Colombiano, ed. (2 de febrero de 2010)

Sports venues in Colombia
Football venues in Colombia